Giuseppe Ramiro Marcone (1882, San Pietro Infine, Italy – 1952, Montevergine) was a Benedictine abbot. He was ordained in 1906 and appointed Abbot of Montevergine, Italy in 1918. He served an Apostolic Visitor to Croatia during World War II, in which capacity he worked on behalf of the Holy See for the protection of Croatian Jews.

In 1941, Pope Pius XII dispatched Marcone as Apostolic Visitor to Nazi-aligned Croatia, in order to assist  Archbishop Aloysius Stepinac and the Croatian Episcopate in "combating the evil influence of neo-pagan propaganda which could be exercised in the organization of the new state". Marcone served as Nuncio in all but name. He reported to Rome on the deteriorating conditions for Croatian Jews, made representations on behalf of the Jews to Croatian officials, and transported Jewish children to safety in neutral Turkey. 
However, he made no efforts on behalf of Serb victims of the Ustaše.

When deportation of Croatian Jews began, Stepinac and Marcone protested to Andrija Artuković. In his study of rescuers of Jews during the Holocaust, Martin Gilbert wrote, "In the Croatian capital of Zagreb, as a result of intervention by [Marcone] on behalf of Jewish partners in mixed marriages, a thousand Croat Jews survived the war.

See also
Catholic Church and Nazi Germany
Foreign relations of Pope Pius XII
Rescue of Jews by Catholics during the Holocaust

References

External links
Holy See's apostolic visitor intervened on behalf of Croatian Jews in WWII; CatholicCulture.Org; 10 August 2011.

Catholic Church in Croatia
People who rescued Jews during the Holocaust
Catholic resistance to Nazi Germany
Diplomats of the Holy See